Tepavia Trans was a charter airline based in Chişinău, Moldova. It was founded on 18 May 1999 and operated cargo and passenger services as well as sub-charter and wet-lease operations. The airline was shut down in 2006.

Fleet 
As of August 2006 the Tepavia Trans fleet included the following aircraft:

2 Antonov An-12
4 Antonov An-28

References

Defunct airlines of Moldova
Airlines established in 1999
Airlines disestablished in 2006
Cargo airlines of Moldova
1999 establishments in Moldova